Agelasta nigrostictica is a species of beetle in the family Cerambycidae. It was described by Stephan von Breuning in 1967. It is known from Java.

References

nigrostictica
Beetles described in 1967